Neponset is an unincorporated community in Summers County, West Virginia, United States. Neponset is located near the east bank of the New River, south of Hinton and north of Peterstown.

The community most likely was named after Neponset, Massachusetts.

References

Unincorporated communities in Summers County, West Virginia
Unincorporated communities in West Virginia